19 High Street is a small mid-19th-century residential domestic building in Llandaff, Cardiff, Wales. The building is a two-storey Grade II listed structure and it was listed because it is "Included for its group value with the other listed buildings around The Cathedral Green and on the High Street".

History

Cadw believe that the small house was probably built in the mid-19th century in the 17th century style. The house is built of roughly coursed multi-coloured Radyr stone with some cut stones. Other buildings in High Street include St Andrew, St Cross, 2-4 High Street and 6 High Street that are also Grade II listed.

References

External links
 

High Street, 19, Llandaff
High Street, Llandaff